Jackie Gibson  may refer to:

 Jackie Gibson (athlete) (1914–1944), South African marathon runner
 Jackie Paraiso (born 1966), American racquetball player who has competed under her married name, Gibson
 Jackie (Gibson) Alper, American folk singer

See also
Jack Gibson (disambiguation)
John Gibson (disambiguation)